Williamston Historic District is a national historic district located at Williamston, Martin County, North Carolina.  The district encompasses 368 contributing buildings, 1 contributing site, and 27 contributing structures in predominantly residential sections of Williamston.  They include notable examples of Federal, Late Gothic Revival, and Colonial Revival architecture in buildings dated from the early-19th century through the 1940s.  Located in the district is the separately listed Asa Biggs House and Site. Other notable buildings include the Williams-Knight House (c. 1800), Duggan-Godard House (1853-1854), Cushing Biggs Hassell House (1847-1848), James Daniel Leggett House (1907), Stalls-Lee House (1925), J. R. Leggett House (1927), and Frank N. Margolis House (1929).

It was listed on the National Register of Historic Places in 2001.

References

Historic districts on the National Register of Historic Places in North Carolina
Federal architecture in North Carolina
Gothic Revival architecture in North Carolina
Colonial Revival architecture in North Carolina
Buildings and structures in Martin County, North Carolina
National Register of Historic Places in Martin County, North Carolina